= Green Springs Mountain =

Mountain in Oregon, United States

Coordinates: 42.1428°N 122.5072°W

Green Springs Mountain is a summit in the U.S. state of Oregon. The elevation is 5,226 feet (1,593 m).

Green Springs Mountain was named for the characteristic green foliage around a mountain spring.
